The Xiaomi Mi MIX 3 is an Android smartphone launched in Beijing on 25 October 2018. It is the successor for the Mi MIX 2 and Mi MIX 2S. This time Xiaomi uses a true bezel-less display with a magnetic sliding front camera setup.

The Xiaomi Mi MIX 3 has an overall score of 103 and a photo score of 108 on DxOMark.

Xiaomi unveiled a 5G version of the Mi MIX 3 on 24 February 2019 at MWC 2019. The Mi MIX 3 5G's hardware remains mostly the same, however, it has a newer Snapdragon 855 processor, a Qualcomm X50 5G modem and a larger 3800 mAh battery. The Mi Mix 3 5G is also more expensive at 600 euros, or $680 (the regular Mi Mix 3 retails for 560 euros, or $535). It went on sale in May 2019, but is not available in Jade Green or Forbidden City Blue, and there is no longer a variant with 10 GB of RAM.

Specifications 
 Display- The Xiaomi Mi MIX 3 comes with a 6.4-inch 2340 x 1080 Full HD+ OLED panel with an aspect ratio of 19.5:9 and a screen-to-body ratio of 93.4%.
 Processor- The Mi MIX 3 is powered by the Qualcomm Snapdragon 845 octa-core processor and the Adreno 630 GPU.
 Camera- The Mi MIX 3 has 4 cameras, two at the front and two at the rear. The back of the phone sports a 12MP Sony IMX363 with f/1.8 aperture, 1.4-micron and a 12MP Samsung S5K3M3+ with f/2.4 aperture, 1-micron pixels camera. It also supports OIS and 960FPS slow-motion videos with AI. There is a 24MP Sony IMX576 sensor with 1.8-micron pixels and a 2MP depth sensor with AI features on the front slider area of the device.
 RAM and Storage- The Mi MIX 3 has 4 variants: 6GB RAM/128GB, 8GB RAM/128GB, 8GB RAM/256 GB and 10GB RAM/256GB.
 Battery- The Mi MIX 3 has a 3200 mAh battery with 10W wireless charging.
 Software- The Xiaomi Mi MIX 3 runs on MIUI 10 based on Android 9 Pie.
 SIM:
 4G variant: dual nano SIMs, - Simultaneous standby 4G w/VoLTE HD on both SIMS.
 5G variant: single nano SIM.

References 

Android (operating system) devices
Phablets
Mobile phones introduced in 2018
Mobile phones with multiple rear cameras
Mobile phones with 4K video recording
Discontinued flagship smartphones
Xiaomi smartphones
Slider phones